Gisostola is a genus of longhorn beetles of the subfamily Lamiinae, containing the following species:

 Gisostola bahiensis Martins & Galileo, 1988
 Gisostola melancholica (Thomson, 1857)
 Gisostola nordestina Galileo & Martins, 1987
 Gisostola quentini Martins & Galileo, 1989

References

Forsteriini